Elections to Mole Valley Council were held on 1 May 2008. One third of the council was up for election and the Conservative Party stayed in overall control of the council. Overall turnout was 46.5% a drop from the 47.2% seen in the 2007 election.

Issues in the election included a proposed incinerator, Council Tax, planning, leisure and recycling. The results saw no change in the number of councillors for each party but the Conservative and Liberal Democrat parties swapped seats. The Conservatives gained Westcott ward from the Liberal Democrats but lost Leatherhead North to them.

After the election, the composition of the council was:
Conservative 22
Liberal Democrat 16
Independent 3

Election result

Ward results

References

2008 Mole Valley election result
Ward results

2008
2008 English local elections
2000s in Surrey